Globicatella sanguinis is a bacterium from the family of Globicatella. Globicatella sanguinis can cause in rare cases acute meningitis and urosepsis.

References

Further reading 
 
 

Bacteria described in 1995
Lactobacillales